Dinghurst fort is an Iron Age univallate hillfort south of Churchill in Somerset, England. The fort is also surrounded by a fosse. Bones, rings, and weapons have been found inside the fort.

References 

Buildings and structures in North Somerset
Hill forts in Somerset
Scheduled monuments in North Somerset